The 1998–99 Club Atlético Boca Juniors season was the 69th consecutive Primera División season played by the senior squad.

Summary 
After the 1998 FIFA World Cup in France, a new head coach arrived to the club: Carlos Bianchi former Velez Sarsfield manager wherein clinched 1994 Intercontinental Cup, 1994 Copa Libertadores and several local titles. The squad is reinforced with Barijho (a petition from Bianchi), Pereda and right back defender Hugo Ibarra. Also midfielder José Basualdo returned to the club. Finally, the team won undefeated  the Apertura Tournament after a drought of 6 years aimed by a solid formation with Martin Palermo scoring 20 goals in 19 matches.

Special uniforms 
Alternate kits only worn in 1999 Copa Mercosur:

Squad

Transfers

January

Competitions

Torneo Apertura

League table

Matches

Torneo Clausura

League table

Matches

Statistics

Players statistics

References

Boc
Club Atlético Boca Juniors seasons